The Campania regional election of 2010 took place on 28–29 March 2010.

The region came out from ten years of undisputed dominance by the centre-left led by Antonio Bassolino (DS).  A former Mayor of Naples and minister, he was re-elected by a landslide 61.6% of the vote in 2005.  However, in his second term in office, Bassolino highly disappointed voters and the whole Italy for his bad management of waste and the subsequent crisis.

The centre-left filed as candidate Vincenzo De Luca, a fellow Democrat and popular Mayor of Salerno who had been one of the loudest critics of Bassolino from within his coalition, but it was not able to recover. Stefano Caldoro, a former minister and leader of the New PSI, merged into The People of Freedom in 2009, won by a convincing margin over De Luca thanks to a 20% swing in favour of the centre-right, which included the Union of the Centre led by Ciriaco De Mita, an influent former leader of Christian Democracy converted into the role of local party boss. After the election, De Mita's nephew, Giuseppe was appointed Vice President by Caldoro.

The People of Freedom was by far the largest party in the region with more than 30% of the vote.

Results

References

Elections in Campania
2010 elections in Italy